The Al-Imam Muhsin Mosque is a historic mosque located in Mosul, Iraq. It is located in Al-Shifa' neighborhood, near the Bash Tapia Castle and in front of the Mausoleum of Yahya Abu al-Qasim. The mosque was initially built as a madrasa known as Madrasa al-Nouri, which was commissioned by the Seljuk ruler Nour ad-Din ibn Ezzadeen in the late-12th century. It became a mausoleum after refurbishment by the Zangid ruler Badr al-Din Lu'lu'. He turned one of the rooms into a shrine and mausoleum of Imam Muhsin, and added a musholla (prayer space) and a minbar. 

The mausoleum was located in an underground shaft in a smaller mosque which was part of the complex. It was destroyed by the Islamic State of Iraq and Levant in 2015 after an attempt to loot the mosque.

See also 

 Islam in Iraq
 List of mosques in Iraq

References

12th-century mosques
Mosques in Mosul
Demolished buildings and structures in Iraq
Destroyed mosques
Buildings and structures destroyed by ISIL
Buildings and structures demolished in 2015